Edwige Avice (born 13 April 1945 in Nevers, France) is a French politician.

References

1945 births
Living people
People from Nevers
Women government ministers of France
20th-century French women politicians